Carland Cross is a settlement in Cornwall, UK.

Carland Cross may also refer to:

Carland Cross (Character), in the TV series
Carland Cross (TV series)